The 1988 Florida Gators football team represented the University of Florida during the 1988 NCAA Division I-A football season. The season  was Galen Hall's fifth as the head coach of the Florida Gators football team.  Hall's 1988 Florida Gators finished with a 7–5 overall record and a Southeastern Conference (SEC) record of 4–3, tying for fourth place among the ten SEC teams.

The Gators started the 1988 season 5–0 and were ranked as high as No. 14.  During an October game against the Memphis State Tigers, star running back Emmitt Smith injured his knee and was unable to play for a month.  Florida lost the Memphis State contest and the next three as well, with the Gator offense unable to score a single touchdown while Smith was sidelined.  The offense under coordinator Lynn Amadee struggled all season, with Gator quarterbacks combining to throw three touchdowns and 17 interceptions, leading one Florida sports columnist to dub the offense the "Amadeeville Horror". Defensive tackle Trace Armstrong was All-SEC in 1988, setting a new school, single-season record for tackles for a loss with nineteen, including seven sacks. In both 1987 and 1988, walk-on safety Louis Oliver was an All-American.

As of the conclusion of the 2022 season, Florida's 16-0 loss to Auburn on October 29, 1988 is the last time the Gators suffered a shutout, and Florida has scored in an all time NCAA record 436 consecutive games.

Schedule

Roster

Rankings

References

Florida
Florida Gators football seasons
All-American Bowl champion seasons
Florida Gators football